Deer Hill is a historic home located at Cornwall in Orange County, New York. It was built about 1875 and is a 2-story, frame dwelling with clapboard siding in the Italianate style.  Also on the property is a -story clapboard barn.

It was listed on the National Register of Historic Places in 1982.

References

Houses on the National Register of Historic Places in New York (state)
Italianate architecture in New York (state)
Houses completed in 1875
Houses in Orange County, New York
National Register of Historic Places in Orange County, New York